The Panama Crisis of 1885 was an intervention by the United States in support of a rebellion in Panama, at the time part of Colombia, and an ensuing show of force by Chile.

Background 
The 1846 Mallarino–Bidlack Treaty, signed by  Republic of New Granada (Colombia and Panama) and the United States, obligated the United States to maintain "neutrality" in the Colombian state of Panama in exchange for transit rights in the isthmus on behalf of Colombia. 

Chile's influence in the region followed its victory in the War of the Pacific. In this war, Chile defeated Bolivia and Peru and gained large swathes of territory from both, removing Bolivia's access to the sea. U.S. imperialist economic interests lay with Bolivia and Peru, and Chile rejected American attempts to mediate. A Peruvian attempt to cede a naval base to the U.S. in Chimbote Bay in 1881 was blocked when Chile, learning of the deal, sent marines to occupy Chimbote.

Panama Crisis 
In March 1885 Colombia thinned its military presence in Panama by sending troops who had been stationed there to fight rebels in Cartagena. These favourable conditions prompted an insurgency in Panama. The United States Navy was sent there to keep order, in light of invoking its obligations according to the treaty being signed in 1846.

On 7 April, the screw sloop USS Shenandoah arrived in Panama City and three days later, other American ships started arriving in Colón, Panama. On 27 April a force of marines was landed in Panama City to help suppress rebels who had taken over the city when local troops had moved out to deal with a revolt in Colón. The next day, federal troops from Colombia arrived from Buenaventura, Colombia's nearest Pacific port. By this time, there was also a small force of the National Army of Colombia supported by a strong contingent of American troops in Colón.

In response to the American intervention, Chile sent the protected cruiser  to Panama City, arriving on April 28. The Esmeraldas captain was ordered to stop by any means an eventual annexation of Panama by the United States. According to a U.S. publication in August 1885, right after the Panama events, "[The Esmeralda] could destroy our whole navy, ship by ship and never be touched once."

See also
Burning of Colón
Bowman H. McCalla
History of Panama (1821–1903)
USS Galena (1880)

Notes

1885 in Colombia
1885 in Panama
Chile–Colombia relations
Chile–United States relations
Colombia–United States relations
1885 in Chile
1885 in the United States 
History of United States expansionism